The Sandefjordsfjord, sometimes also called the Sandefjord, is an approximately 9 km long fjord in the municipality of Sandefjord in Vestfold, Norway. It is located to the west of Vesterøya. The Sandefjordsfjord is the longest of the four fjords located in Sandefjord, Norway. It is a wide fjord which gradually shrinks northbound towards the city harbor. The name dates to Sverris saga from 1200 AD. 

As the town came into existence, the name gradually came to be applied to it, and the need for an expression to allow references to the fjord, as opposed to the town, emerged.  was the pleonastic result.

The name  was suggested during the Sandar-Sandefjord merge in the 1960s, but its current name was ultimately kept.

References

Fjords of Vestfold og Telemark
Sandefjord